David atte Hacche (fl. 1377–1393) was a politician from Reading in the English county of Berkshire.

Family
David may possibly have originated from Hare Hatch in Wargrave, east of Reading. He became a victualler in Reading and the poll tax information from 1379 shows him to have been married to a woman named Maud.

Political career
Hacche was Mayor of Reading from 1382 until 1383. He was also elected a Member (MP) of the Parliament of England for Reading in October 1377, 1378, February 1388 and 1393.

References

Year of birth missing
Year of death missing
English MPs October 1377
People from Reading, Berkshire
Mayors of Reading, Berkshire
People from Wargrave
British grocers
English MPs 1378
English MPs February 1388
English MPs 1393